Eugenia Siarheyeuna Tkachenka (born 24 December 1997) is a Belarusian competitive ice dancer. With former partner Yuri Hulitski, she placed 10th at the 2012 Winter Youth Olympics and 17th at the 2015 World Junior Championships in Tallinn, Estonia.

Programs 
(with Hulitski)

Competitive highlights 
JGP: Junior Grand Prix

With Hulitski

References

External links 
 

1997 births
Belarusian female ice dancers
Living people
Figure skaters from Minsk
Figure skaters at the 2012 Winter Youth Olympics
20th-century Belarusian women
21st-century Belarusian women